The 2021–22 Clarkson Golden Knights Men's ice hockey season was the 100th season of play for the program. They represented Clarkson University in the 2021–22 NCAA Division I men's ice hockey season and for the 61st season in the ECAC Hockey conference. The Golden Knights were coached by  Casey Jones, in his 11th season, and played their home games at Cheel Arena.

Season
After twice missing out on a chance to participate in the NCAA tournament, both as a direct result of COVID-19, Clarkson entered the '22 season looking for a bit of redemption. The Golden Knights got off to a less-than-stellar start, holding a .500 record in early November with three of their wins coming against Alaska, who were still recovering from not having played at all the year before. A strong performance from defending Rookie of the Year Ethan Haider in the second month helped Clarkson right the ship and enabled the team to climb back into the rankings by the beginning of December. Just as things were looking up for the team, Haider's game began to slip. He allowed 13 goals in three games with Clarkson losing each match.

The second half of the season was dominated by Haider being replaced in goal by Jacob Mucitelli while the team's nominal starter fought to rediscover his game. Mucitelli played well in goal, helping the Knights to an 11-game stretch where they didn't lose once. The hefty win total allowed Clarkson to get into the top-15 with a potential shot at an at-large bid but the team had a problem. ECAC Hockey possessed a terrible non-conference record. Part of the league's problem was that eight member teams had not played in 2021 and many were slow to get back into the swing of things. Whatever the cause, however, the poor marks meant that most of Clarkson's conference opponents were rated as weak competition in the PairWise rankings. This meant that each win for Clarkson didn't help the team as much as it otherwise would have while losses proved to be a sizable drag on their postseason hopes. When Clarkson lost two games near the end of the year, the team was pushed out of at-large contention despite being 10 games above .500.

Even finishing second in the conference didn't help Clarkson for the NCAA tournament, but it did give the team a decent draw for the conference quarterfinals. By that time, Haider and Mucitelli were in a battle for the starting role and each was given the chance to play one of the games against Union. Clarkson won both games in overtime but with Haider allowing fewer goals, he was given the start in the semifinal match versus Harvard. Entering the game, Clarkson was just outside the cutoff for an at-large bid and would have to at least reach the conference championship game to make the tournament. The Knights were locked in a close battle against the Crimson for much of the game, twice tying the score in the first two periods before taking a 1-goal lead into the third. Harvard ended up scoring three goals in the final frame to Clarkson's none and the Knights narrowly missed out on the tournament.

Departures

Recruiting

Roster
As of August 23, 2021.

Standings

Schedule and results

|-
!colspan=12 style=";" | Exhibition

|-
!colspan=12 style=";" | Regular Season

|-
!colspan=12 style=";" | 

|- align="center" bgcolor="#e0e0e0"
|colspan=12|Clarkson Won Series 2–0

Scoring statistics

Goaltending statistics

Rankings

Note: USCHO did not release a poll in week 24.

Awards and honors

Players drafted into the NHL

2022 NHL Entry Draft

† incoming freshman

References

2021–22
Clarkson Golden Knights
Clarkson Golden Knights
Clarkson Golden Knights
Clarkson Golden Knights